The Choreonematoideae are a monogeneric nongeniculate subfamily of Coralline algae.

References 

Bikont subfamilies
Monotypic bikont taxa
Corallinales